Hornbeck can refer to any of the following:

People 
 E. K. Hornbeck, fictional character in Inherit the Wind (play)
John Westbrook Hornbeck (1804–1848), American politician
Shawn Hornbeck (born 1991), American kidnap victim
William Hornbeck (1901–1983), American film editor

Places 
Hornbeck, Louisiana, United States
Hornbeck, Alberta, Canada

Other uses 
Hornbeck Offshore Services
 E. K. Hornbeck, fictional character in the play Inherit the Wind